Narcissus serotinus is a species of the genus Narcissus (daffodils) in the family Amaryllidaceae. It is classified in Section Serotini. It is native to southern Europe from Portugal to Greece. It also native to Israel, where it blossoms in the autumn.

Description 
Narcissus serotinus has one of the smallest coronas of the genus (see illustration). The flowers are fragrant, the tepals white and the small corona yellow.

References 

serotinus
Garden plants
Flora of Spain
Flora of Malta